Olyra burmanica is a species of longtail catfish endemic to Myanmar where it is found in Pegu Yomas.

References

Catfish of Asia
Fish of Myanmar
Endemic fauna of Myanmar
Fish described in 1872